A triangle choke, or sankaku-jime (三角絞) in judo, is a type of figure-four chokehold that encircles the opponent's neck and one arm with the legs in a configuration similar to the shape of a triangle. Applying pressure using both legs and the opponent's own shoulder, the technique is a type of lateral vascular restraint that constricts the blood flow from the carotid arteries to the brain, potentially resulting in loss of  consciousness in seconds when applied correctly. Recent studies have shown that the triangle choke takes an average of 9.5 seconds to render an opponent unconscious from the moment it is properly applied.

History
 

The triangle choke was seen in early kosen judo competition.
While details of its origin are unknown, it is strongly associated to Yaichibei Kanemitsu and his apprentice Masaru Hayakawa, who featured the first registered use of the move in a kosen judo tournament in Kobe, Hyogo in November 1921. According to Kanemitsu himself, a primitive version of the move had been shown by Takenouchi-ryū master Senjuro Kanaya around 1890, though it was apparently a simpler form of neckscissors without the posterior triangle action. The sankaku-jime was officially adopted and endorsed by important judokas like Masami Oyama, and soon met plenty of use both in kosen judo and mainstream judo. Tsunetane Oda, a fellow kosen judoka, demonstrated the technique on video and is also credited with the creation of the move in some sources.

Martial arts historian Toshiya Masuda has attributed its innovation to Masahiko Kimura, who would have created it during the Takudai kosen judo tournament at Takushoku University and accomplished prolonged success with it, though he also deems probable that Kimura only popularized the variation instead of creating it.

Among those variations, the front triangle is particularly favored by practitioners of Brazilian jiu-jitsu. According to a popular belief maintained by Romero Cavalcanti, the technique was introduced in Brazilian jiu-jitsu by Rolls Gracie after finding it in a judo book. Márcio "Macarrão" Stambowsky, who was named by Rickson Gracie as one of the earliest Brazilian competitors to popularize the concept, has also credited Rolls. Other sources, like Toshiya Masuda and Roberto Pedreira, believe it might have been introduced in Brazil much earlier by Yasuichi and Naoichi Ono, disciples of Yaichibei Kanemitsu himself, as well as possibly other judo practitioners like Ryuzo Ogawa. Rolls trainee Mario Tallarico lends credibility to this theory,  as does a 1935 newspaper clipping that depicts Yasuichi Ono performing a Triangle Choke in his training for an upcoming fight with Helio Gracie.

The triangle choke was first shown in mixed martial arts on March 11, 1994, when Jason Delucia used a triangle to defeat Scott Baker at UFC 2. This variation has remained as the most commonly seen in MMA, although the side or inverted triangle has been also used; on September 26, 1995, Shooto fighter Rumina Sato submitted Isamu Osugi with a flying inverted triangle choke. Many years later, Toby Imada won 2009 Submission of the Year with an inverted triangle choke over Jorge Masvidal at Bellator 5. Even more complex holds, like Chris Lytle's inverted mounted triangle/straight armbar combination at UFC 116 in 2010, have also surfaced.

In professional wrestling, The Undertaker used a variation of the move as a finishing submission, called the “Hells Gate.”

Technique 

Tactically speaking, the triangle choke is a very effective attack employed from the bottom position, generally applied from the guard, or open guard. The choke can also be applied in the mount, side mount and back mount positions by more advanced grappling practitioners. The need for isolation of one arm could be a rationale for the frequency with which it is attempted in mixed martial arts and combat sports due to the brief vulnerability of one arm while executing hand strikes against an opponent in one of the aforementioned positions.

Defensive action
To escape a triangle choke, the defending practitioner must first elevate their head so as to preclude the full force of the submission, and subsequently must bring their arm away from opposition with their own carotid artery. Once out of immediate danger of loss of consciousness, the practitioner can concentrate on reversing or escaping the figure-four lock. One method for this is to break the opponent's legs apart. With the opposing practitioner applying the choke in a bottom guard position, the defender should start to stand up, with both hands stacked and bearing weight on or above the breast opposite the arm in the choke (or gripping the collar of the opponent's gi). When the defender is nearly standing and leaning over so as to bring their weight to bear on their opponent, the defender should start to walk to the side opposite the captured arm. This pushes the defender's back and shoulder into the leg wrapped around their back, and forces the opponent's other leg to reach forward to maintain the lock. This weakens the strength of the choke and allows the defender to muscle out or force the attacker to release the choke. 
In mixed martial arts, it is possible for the defender to lift the person applying the choke and slam them down with a powerbomb (also known as a slam) to get them to release the hold.

Further reading
The Triangle by Rigan Machado with David Meyer (2004)

See also
Arm triangle choke
List of judo techniques
Ground fighting

References

External links

 Triangle Choke Instructional Videos

Grappling positions
Chokeholds